Aissa Belkadi is an Algerian Table Tennis player. Belkadi competed in the 2018 ITTF African-Cup, finishing third place in group 3 thus being eliminating from contention. In the placement round, Belkadi defeated Allan Arnachellum (3-0), before losing to both Kurt Lingeveldt (0-3) and Shane Overmeyer (2-3), finishing twelfth in the event.

References

Algerian male table tennis players
Living people
Year of birth missing (living people)
21st-century Algerian people